Aleksandr Michael Sakharovsky (3 September 1909 – 12 November 1983) was a Soviet General who was head of the First Chief Directorate (foreign intelligence) of the KGB from 1955 until 1970. Sakharovsky oversaw the KGB foreign intelligence division during some of the key events of the Cold War, including the Hungarian uprising and the Cuban Missile Crisis.

Biography

Sakarovsky was born to a working family in Kostroma Oblast, on 3 September 1909. His family moved to Leningrad when he was a child, and he began his career as a plater at the Baltic Shipyard. He was drafted into the Red Army in 1931 and by 1939 was working for the Leningrad NKVD recruiting foreign seamen to work as intelligence agents. During the Second World War he rose to the rank of Major, responsible primarily for counter-espionage  against Nazi Germany in the Leningrad region.

In 1946 Sakarovsky was transferred to the MGB, the precursor organization to the KGB, in Moscow. There he acted in support to Andrey Vyshinsky, a deputy Soviet People's Commissar of Foreign Affairs, during the incorporation of Latvia, Estonia and Lithuania into the Soviet Union during the late 1940s. 
He was later chief of the second Information committee (KI) department, then MGB advisor during the establishment of the Securitate, the secret police agency of Communist Romania from 1949 to 1953. During his time in Romania he was responsible for the interrogation of Lucrețiu Pătrășcanu, a communist leader critical of Stalin.
Before he became advisor to Securitate, from 1949 to 1953.
Sakharovsky was serving in MGB and later in Information committee. Witch was MGB combined with GRU from 9.1946 till 6.1947 as head of Section 7-A (responsible for foreign intelligence in Scandinavia) of 1-A Directorate (responsible for foreign illegal Intelligence) in FCD of the MGB USSR. After the creation on May 30, 1947, of Information committee under the supervision of Ministry of Foreign Affairs, from that time till November 1949
he was head of 2nd Department in KI  2nd Directorate  (European) and from September 1948 was a deputy chief of 2nd KI Directorate.

Before Sakharovsky was appointed head of KGB's First Chief Directorate from 6.23.1955 till May 12, 1956  he was acting chief of FCD KGB under the Council of Ministers of USSR 
In May 1956 Sakharovsky was appointed head of  First Chief Directorate of the KGB  under the Council of Ministers of USSR, responsible for foreign operations and intelligence collection activities by the training and management of the covert agents, intelligence collection management, and the collection of political, scientific and technical intelligence. The first years of his tenure saw the creation of US military-political blocs, NATO, CENTO, SEATO; the Suez Crisis; the Hungarian uprising and the escalating crisis in Berlin. In 1957 Rudolf Abel, an illegal KGB technical agent posted in New York City was discovered by the FBI, in 1961 Konon Molody, another illegal spy, was uncovered in London by MI5.

Sakharovsky was named "the father of international terrorism" by Ion Mihai Pacepa, due to his alleged approach to turning "grassroots" terrorism into a weapon weakening USSR's political enemies. Pacepa claimed Sakharovsky organized trainings for Palestinian terrorists on hijacking and bombing civilian airplanes and published propaganda journals in Arabic, reprinting antisemitic fakes such as The Protocols of the Elders of Zion to fuel the Arabic-Israeli conflict. as well as created a "scientific" approach to covert assassinations disguised as regular car accidents.

Later life and death

From July 1971 to January 1975, he was senior advisor to the chairman of the KGB. Seriously ill, he suffered a stroke 1 February 1975 after which he retired. He died 12 November 1983  and was buried at Novodevichy Cemetery.

References

1909 births
1983 deaths
KGB officers
Soviet colonel generals
Russian people of World War II
Burials at Novodevichy Cemetery
Recipients of the Order of Lenin
Recipients of the Order of the Red Banner
Grand Crosses of the Order of Polonia Restituta